Z Force, force z, or variation, may refer to:

Military 
Z Force (Bangladesh), a guerrilla unit during the Bangladesh Liberation War
Z Force (Burma), an intelligence-gathering unit of the British Fourteenth Army in Burma
Z Special Unit, an Australian-British-New Zealand commando unit in the South West Pacific theatre, also known as "Z Force"
Force Z of the Royal Navy
Z (Military symbol), prominent and standard label for Russian forces during the 2022 Russian Invasion of Ukraine

Other uses 

 Flashback (Six Flags Magic Mountain), a rollercoaster that was known as Z Force
 z-force or force z (physics), an axial force
 Zforce, a sensory product made by Neonode

See also
Y Force
X force (disambiguation)
Force (disambiguation)
Z (disambiguation)